Bernard Patrick "Bunny" Larkin (born 11 January 1936) is an English former professional footballer who played at inside forward or wing half. He played in the First Division of the Football League and in European competition for Birmingham City, and in the Football League for Norwich City, Doncaster Rovers, Watford and Lincoln City.

Biography
Larkin was born in Digbeth, Birmingham. He joined local club Birmingham City as a 16-year-old wing half, signing professional forms at 18. He made his debut at inside left in October 1956, when he was nearly 21; the club had a big squad in those days, and it was not unusual for a player to be well into his twenties before getting into the first team on a regular basis.
"When I joined the club the staff was bigger than is normal nowadays. We even had pros playing for the fifth team and by the time you reached the 'A' team there were some very good players indeed."
He scored on debut, but still only played another six games that season.
He played more frequently the following season, filling in at right-half for Johnny Watts. He took part in both legs of the semi-final of the 1955–58 Inter-Cities Fairs Cup against Barcelona, though he missed the replay.
His career changed in November 1958, when he was selected at inside left in place of the ageing Peter Murphy. Between then and the end of the season he scored 23 goals in all competitions, including four goals in the early rounds of the 1958–60 Fairs Cup, which made him the club's top scorer for the 1958–59 season. He attributed his goalscoring success to being two-footed:
"I'd always scored goals wherever I'd played. I had the advantage of being able to use both feet to shoot. That meant that you didn't have to change your position when the ball came to you. There don't seem to be many players around nowadays that can do that."
He contributed another goal in the Fairs Cup semi-final, but by the time the final against Barcelona came round, he had lost form and left the club, transferred to Norwich City for a fee of £10,000.
An incident in which he overslept and missed the flight to a European away game did not help his cause.

He spent two seasons at Norwich, then went on to Doncaster Rovers, Watford, Lincoln City and to non-league clubs including Wisbech Town, Nuneaton Borough, King's Lynn and Stevenage Athletic.
He had the distinction of being the first Lincoln City player ever to be substituted in the Football League. After retiring from football he settled in the Norwich area and became a salesman for a bakery firm.

Honours
with Birmingham City
Club's top league scorer 1959

References

External links
Profile at UK A–Z Transfers (Neil Brown)

1936 births
Living people
Footballers from Birmingham, West Midlands
English footballers
Association football midfielders
Association football forwards
Birmingham City F.C. players
Norwich City F.C. players
Doncaster Rovers F.C. players
Watford F.C. players
Lincoln City F.C. players
Wisbech Town F.C. players
Nuneaton Borough F.C. players
King's Lynn F.C. players
Stevenage Athletic F.C. players
English Football League players
Southern Football League players